Coralliophila salebrosa is a species of sea snail, a marine gastropod mollusk, in the family Muricidae, the murex snails or rock snails.

Distribution
This species occurs in Guadeloupe.

References

salebrosa
Gastropods described in 1864